Chromium hexafluoride or chromium(VI) fluoride (CrF6) is a hypothetical chemical compound between chromium and fluorine with the chemical formula CrF6.  It was previously thought to be an unstable yellow solid decomposing at −100 °C, but this has been shown to be a misidentification of chromium pentafluoride, CrF5.

Unsuccessful attempts at synthesis
CrF6 used to be thought to be produced by exhaustive fluorination of chromium metal at 400 °C and 20 MPa of pressure, and immediate freezing out of the reaction chamber to prevent decomposition:

Cr + 3 F2 → CrF6

However, it has been shown that chromium pentafluoride (CrF5) is formed instead:

2 Cr + 5 F2 → 2 CrF5

and that CrF6 has yet to be synthesized.

References 

Chromium(VI) compounds
Chromium–halogen compounds
Metal halides
Hexafluorides
Hypothetical chemical compounds